Nedre Slettheia is a neighbourhood in the city of Kristiansand in Agder county, Norway. It is located in the borough of Vågsbygd and in the district of Slettheia. Nedre Slettheia is south of Rugde, northeast of Gislemyr, west of Blørstad, and east of Øvre Slettheia.

Transportation

References

Geography of Kristiansand
Neighbourhoods of Kristiansand